MS Superfast I may refer:

  in service under this name 1995–2004; later Eurostar Roma, now Skania
  in service under this name 2008–present; Built as Froza but sold and renamed before completion.

Ship names